Rapala Fishing Frenzy 2009 is a fishing video game developed by Fun Labs. It is the sequel to Rapala Tournament Fishing and was released by Activision for the Xbox 360, PlayStation 3 and Wii on September 2, 2008. The Wii version is known as simply Rapala's Fishing Frenzy.

References 

2008 video games
Xbox 360 games
Activision games
Fishing video games
Video games developed in Romania
PlayStation 3 games
Wii games
Fun Labs games
Single-player video games
Sand Grain Studios games
Magic Wand Productions games